La Moca Ranch is a colonia and census-designated place (CDP) in Webb County, Texas, United States. It was first listed as a CDP prior to the 2020 census.

It is in the northern part of the county, along U.S. Route 83, and bordered to the east by Los Huisaches. US-83 leads south  to Laredo and north-northwest  to Carrizo Springs.

Education
Residents are in the United Independent School District. Zoned schools include: San Isidro Elementary School, Elias Herrera Middle School, United High School.

The designated community college for Webb County is Laredo Community College.

References 

Populated places in Webb County, Texas
Census-designated places in Webb County, Texas
Census-designated places in Texas